Tilston is a village and a civil parish in the unitary authority of Cheshire West and Chester and the ceremonial county of Cheshire, England. At the 2001 Census, the population was recorded as 627, reducing to 603 at the 2011 census. 

St Mary's Church, Tilston, is a Grade II* listed building.

History
Tilston was the site of a Roman town, known as Bovium, which was a station on the Roman equivalent of Watling Street between the larger settlements at Deva Victrix (Chester) and Viroconium (Wroxeter).

In 1066 after the Battle of Hastings the area of present-day Tilston was taken from the Anglo-Saxons. Hugh Lupus, the nephew of King William I was given these lands. Hugh then gave parts of this land to his supporters. The village of Tilston was given to a knight named Eynion who was the called Eynion de Tilston. The Manor of Tilston was near the border to Wales. In the 12th century, Wales was not part of the Kingdom of England and the Welsh people constantly raided England. Wales was eventually conquered. The Tilston lords lived in a castle on the manor. The Tilston family eventually lost the manor with the demise of feudalism.

See also

Listed buildings in Tilston

References

External sources
Tilston Parish Council's website 
Early History of the Tillotson Family in England 
Eynion
Tilson Genealogy
Tillotson

External links

Civil parishes in Cheshire
Villages in Cheshire